The Sentinel Homes Premier Hockey League is a field hockey competition organised by Hockey New Zealand, which replaced the New Zealand National Hockey League.

The competition serves as New Zealand's premier domestic hockey league, helping unearth future talent for selection to the country's national teams; the Black Sticks.

The Central Falcons were the inaugural tournament champions in both the men's and women's editions, taking out the 2020 titles.

History
The Sentinel Homes Premier Hockey League was founded in 2020. The tournament was formed following an overhaul of the New Zealand National Hockey League (NHL), and replaced the tournament to serve as New Zealand's premier hockey competition.

The League features many format adjustments which were introduced in the 2019 editions of the NHL. 

In 2020, it was confirmed that the league had secured a major partnership with Sentinel Homes, with naming rights also afforded to the company, forming the Sentinel Homes Premier Hockey League.

Format

Teams

 Central Falcons
 Hauraki Mavericks
 Northern Tridents
 Southern Alpiners

Men's tournament

Summaries

Women's tournament

Summaries

Awards
In both the men's and women's competitions, Hockey New Zealand presents a most valuable player (MVP) award at the conclusion of the tournament. The name of each trophy comes from that of past Black Sticks players. The men's trophy is named after father and son, Jeff and Ryan Archibald, forming the Archibald Trophy, while the women's trophy is named after Suzie Muirhead.

Winners of both the Archibald and Muirhead trophies are listed below.

See also
Hockey New Zealand
New Zealand National Hockey League

References

External links
Hockey New Zealand
Black Sticks
Sentinel Homes

Field hockey competitions in New Zealand
Professional sports leagues in New Zealand
Field hockey leagues in Oceania
Sports leagues established in 2020
2020 establishments in New Zealand